This is a list of shopping centres in Denmark:

Copenhagen and suburbs 
Field's, Ørestad (opened in 2004, 145 stores, 115.000 m2, turnover 2006: DKK 2.2 bil.)
Fisketorvet, Copenhagen (opened in 2000, 120 stores, 55.000 m2, turnover 2006: 1.36 bil.)
Lyngby Storcenter, Lyngby (opened in 1973, 114 stores, 34.100 m2, turnover 2006: DKK 1.738 bil.)
City 2, Tåstrup (opened in 1975, 111 stores, 100.000 m2, turnover 2006: DKK 1.5 bil.)
Rødovre Centrum, Rødovre (opened in 1966 (first shopping mall in Denmark), 105 stores, 65.140 m2, turnover 2006: DKK 1.437 bil.)
Frederiksberg Centret, Frederiksberg (opened in 1996, 90 stores, 30.000 m2)
Waves, Hundige (opened in 1974, 85 stores, 28.400 m2, turnover 2006: DKK 1.75 bil.)
Amager Centret, Amager (opened in 1975, 67 stores, 16.000 m2)
Ballerup Centret, Ballerup (opened in 1973, 66 stores, 30.690 m2)
Hørsholm Midtpunkt, Hørsholm (65 stores)
Spinderiet, Valby (opened in 2007, 50–60 stores, 18.000 m2)
Glostrup Storcenter, Glostrup (opened in 1972, 50 stores, 25.000 m2)
Copenhagen Airport shopping Center, Kastrup (49 stores)
Hvidovre C (Hvidovre Stationscenter), Hvidovre (43 stores, 10.000 m2)
Ishøj Bycenter, Ishøj (opened in 1977, 40 stores, 20.000 m2)
Waterfront, Hellerup (opened in 2007, 35 stores, 16.000 m2)
Frihedens Butikscenter, Hvidovre (32 stores)
Copenhagen Central Station Shopping Centre, Vesterbro, Copenhagen (opened 1994, 31 stores)
Nørrebro Bycenter, Nørrebro (opened in 1995, 22 stores, 11.000 m2)
Farup bytorv, Farum (opened in 1978, 40 stores, 14.700 m2)
 Galleri K

Århus and suburbs 
Bazar vest, Brabrand (110 stores, 16.000m²)
Bruun's Galleri, Århus (opened in 2003, 97 stores, 90.000 m2) combined 103 stores 140,000 m2)
City Vest, Århus V (opened in 1972, 65 stores, 45.000 m2)
Storcenter Nord, Århus N (65 stores) 40.000 m2)
Viby Centret, Viby (32 stores, 20.000 m2)
Veri Center, Risskov (32 stores, 18.000 m2)
Skejby Centret, Skejby (29 stores, 8.138 m2)
Center Syd, Tranbjerg (22 stores, 7.000 m2)
Hørning butikscenter, Hørning (18 stores)
Clemens, Århus (17 stores, 10.000 m2)
Center Øst, Egå (16 stores)
Kridthøj torv, Højbjerg (15 stores)
Skåde centret, Skåde-Holme (15 stores)
Hadsten centret, Hadsten (15 stores)
Rundhøj centret, Højbjerg (15 stores)
Trøjborg Centret, Århus (5.000 m2)

Odense and suburbs 
Rosengårdcentret, Odense SØ (153 stores and restaurants, 100.000 m2)
Tarup Center, Odense NV (44 stores, 22.000 m2)
Vollsmose Torv, Vollsmose
Odense Banegård Center, Odense C
Fyn Bazar

Aalborg and suburbs 
Aalborg Storcenter, Skalborg (65 stores, 46.000 m2)
Kennedy Arkaden, Aalborg (12 stores, 8.000 m2)
Friis Center, Aalborg (22 stores, 7.500 m2)
Shoppen, Skalborg (17 stores, 28.000 m2) (next to Aalborg Storcenter)

Frederikssund 
Sillebroen Shoppingcenter, Frederikssund (75 stores, 28.000 m2) opened in 2010

Elsinore (Helsingør) and suburbs 
Elsinore bycenter, Elsinore (25 stores)
Prøvestenscentret, Elsinore, (32 stores, 32.000 m2)
Espergærde Centret, Espergærde (43 stores) the oldest shopping mall in Denmark

Herning 
 Herning Centret, Herning (76 stores)

Hillerød 
Slotsarkaderne, Hillerød (opened in 1992, 65 stores, 25.500 m2)

Horsens 
 Bytorv Horsens, Horsens (opened in 2006, 31 stores, 6.400 m2)

Kolding 
Kolding Storcenter (opened in 1993, 120+ stores, 62.000 m2)

Esbjerg 
Esbjerg Storcenter (opened in 1993, 40 stores, 18.000 m2)
Broen (opened in 2017, 60 stores, 27.000 m2)
Sædding Centret (opened in 1977, 14 stores, 14.000 m2)

Hjørring 
metropol (opened in 2008, 35 stores, 46.500 m2)

Næstved 
Næstved Storcenter, Næstved (opened in 1989, 65 stores, 50.000 m2)
Sct. Jørgens Park, Næstved (20+ stores)

Randers 
Randers Storcenter, Paderup (opened in 1998, 40 stores, 25.000 m2)

Roskilde 
Ro's Torv, Roskilde (opened in 2003, 75 stores, 47.000 m2)

Slagelse 
Vestsjællands Centret, Slagelse (opened in 1969, 40 stores, 23.000 m2)

Vejle 
Bryggen, Vejle centrum (opened in 2008, 80 stores, 23.000 m2)
Mary's, Vejle centrum (opened in 2007, 50 stores, 20.000 m2)

Viborg 
 Sct. Mathias Centret, Viborg (34 stores)

Denmark
Shopping malls